TUGSA may refer to:

 Temple University Graduate Students Association
 Touro University Gay-Straight Alliance